Thideer Kannaiah was an Indian film and stage actor. He has acted in more than 500 films. His debut film was Aval Oru Thodarkathai. He is notable for his comedian roles along with actors Goundamani and Vadivelu. While he was in the drama, he appeared mostly in the breakthrough scenes. Therefore, he was called as "Thideer" Kannaiah.

Early life 
Kanniah, who is native to Chennai, has worked in various drama troupes since childhood. he made his debut in the industry with the film aval oru thodarkathai (1974). While working at the chennai perambur railway coach factory, he started acting in films.

Film career 
Director K. Balachandar, he made his acting debut in the Tamil film industry. He acted as the bus conductor. He has acted in more than 500 films Apoorva Ragangal, Karotti Kannan, Priya, Vellai Roja, Yettikki Potti, Apoorva Sagodharargal, Enna Petha Rasa and Pokkiri.

Family 
Kannaya has a wife Rajeshwari, a son Ramesh and a daughter Chitra, Grand Son Sathish and Grand Daughter Preetha, Vanitha, Pooja

Death 
He died of heart attack on November 17, 2013 at the age of 77.

Filmography 
This is a partial filmography. You can expand it.

1970s

1980s

1990s

2000s

References 

1936 births
2013 deaths